Millennial Choirs & Orchestras (MCO) is a musical organization that was founded in 2007 for the purpose of teaching and encouraging excellence in sacred and classical music, especially to its youth.  The organization prioritizes in offering music performance education, with a focus on the works and styles of classical composers. MCO has six locations: California (Orange County), Arizona (East Valley), Texas (Dallas), Texas (Austin), Utah (Utah County and Davis County), and Idaho (Boise). Each location comprises four youth choirs, an adult choir, and a symphony orchestra.

Participants

The choirs of MCO consist of singers ranging from age four through adult. The Symphony Orchestra consists of accomplished instrumentalists. The ensembles are constructed as follows:
 Symphony Orchestra: Advanced instrumentalists (auditioned)
 Grand Chorus: Advanced adult men and women singers (18+, auditioned)
 Concert Choir: High school-aged (9th–12th grade)
 Youth Chorus: Middle school–aged (6th–8th grade)
 Children’s Chorus: Elementary school–aged (2nd–5th grade)
 Young Singers Chorus: Young children (age 4–1st grade)

About

MCO was founded in 2007 by brothers and musicians Dr. Brett Stewart and Brandon Stewart. The organization's artistic staff also includes the following musical directors: Dr. Cory Mendenhall, Dr. Joni Jensen, Dr. Jodi Reed, Emily Cook, and Christina Bishop. MCO operates under the parent organization Millennial® Music, which is a private 501(c)(3) nonprofit organization. Annually, more than 4,000 individuals participate in MCO.

Locales
 California MCO (Orange County)
 Arizona MCO (East Valley)
 Utah MCO (Davis/Utah Counties)
 Texas MCO (Dallas)
 Texas MCO (Austin)
 Idaho MCO (Boise/Treasure Valley)

History
 California MCO, formerly Orange County Millennial Choirs & Orchestras (OCMCO), is founded in Orange County, California in the fall of 2007.
 MCO expands to East Valley (Phoenix metropolitan area) in the fall of 2009.
 MCO releases its debut album That Easter Morn on December 1, 2009.
 MCO releases its second album Messiah in America on December 13, 2011.
 MCO releases its third album O Holy Night, also their first Christmas album, on November 6, 2012.
 In March 2013, MCO was invited to perform at the National Conference of the American Choral Directors Association (ACDA) in the Meyerson Symphony Center in Dallas, Texas.
 MCO expands to Dallas, Texas and Salt Lake County/Utah County, Utah in the fall of 2013.
 MCO releases its fourth album To Be American on July 1, 2014.
 MCO expands to the Boise, Idaho region in the fall of 2015.
 In June 2016, participants from MCO's five locales participated in its "God & Country Tour" to Washington, D.C.
 MCO releases Amazing Grace, its fifth album on October 28, 2016.
 In June 2017, participants from MCO's five locales performed and recorded selections from their Be Still, My Soul concert repertoire in the Salt Lake Tabernacle at Temple Square in Salt Lake City, Utah.
 On July 12–13, 2019, participants from MCO's five locales performed two concerts with selections from their Nearer, My God, To Thee concert repertoire at Carnegie Hall in New York, New York, featuring soloists Jenny Oaks Baker (violinist) and Erin Morley (soprano). The third concert, which included participants from California and Utah, was cancelled due to the Manhattan blackout of July 2019.
 MCO releases Millennial Song, its sixth album, on October 25, 2019.
 MCO releases Star of Wonder, its seventh album, on December 16, 2020.
 MCO expands to Austin, Texas and Davis County, Utah in August 2021.

Discography

See also
http://www.millennial.org/

Notes

References

External links

 

American choirs
Choral societies
Contemporary classical music ensembles
Newport Beach, California
Musical groups established in 2007
2007 establishments in California